Thomas Michael Rosica, C.S.B., (born March 3, 1959) in Rochester, New York, is a Roman Catholic priest and a Basilian Father. He is an author, speaker, and commentator. He was formerly Chief Executive Officer (CEO) of Salt and Light Catholic Media Foundation, English language media attaché of the Holy See Press Office, and president of Assumption University in Windsor, Ontario, a Roman Catholic institution associated with the University of Windsor.

Education 
Rosica has an undergraduate degree in French and Italian from St. John Fisher College, in Pittsford, NY. He entered the Congregation of St. Basil as a novice and studied theology and sacred scripture at Regis College in Toronto. He continued his studies in theology and scripture at the Pontifical Biblical Institute in Rome, and then École Biblique et Archéologique Française de Jérusalem.

World Youth Day 2002 and Salt + Light Television 
Rosica was appointed by the Canadian Conference of Catholic Bishops as the National Director and Chief Executive Officer of the 17th World Youth Day 2002 in Toronto. The theme of the World Youth Day was "You are the salt of the earth... you are the light of the world." Shortly after the World Youth Day, Thomas Rosica was approached by the founder of St. Joseph Communications, Gaetano Gagliano, to run a religious television network. The new television station was named "Salt + Light Television" after the theme of the World Youth Day 2002 and began its broadcast on July 1, 2003 with only two employees.

Vatican 
Rosica served as the Vatican's English language spokesperson for the transition in the papacy during February and March, 2013 and as media advisor at the Vatican for the October 2018 Synod of Bishops.

Plagiarism and retracted publications 
Since 2015, Rosica has regularly been accused of plagiarism in his publications, blog postings, and speeches. On February 17, 2015 Rosica issued a cease and desist letter against David Domet, of the Catholic blog Vox Cantoris, accusing Domet of having made false and defamatory statements about Rosica.  The document from Folger, Rubinoff LLP, demanded that nine statements, made by Domet, be retracted from the blog with a public apology made to Rosica.

On March 4, 2015 Rosica announced in his blog that his intention was not to sue Domet, but to make him "cease and desist the frivolous calumny." Rosica explained that the legal firm, offering its service pro bono to him, had issued the letter on his behalf, and that he considered the matter "closed."

In February 2019, Rosica stepped down from the governing boards of University of St. Michael's College in Toronto, St. John Fisher College in New York and University of St. Thomas in Houston following accusations of plagiarism. In March 2019, Rosica went on sabbatical from the Salt and Light Catholic Media Foundation for "several months of rest and renewal." On June 17, 2019, the board of directors of Salt and Light accepted Rosica's resignation as CEO.  On June 21, 2019, the Canadian Conference of Catholic Bishops announced that it retracted Rosica's works published by the CCCB because the works "failed to provide all the appropriate citations, as well as bibliographic references, and did not acknowledge a number of original sources". Rosica said, "I realize that I was not prudent nor vigilant with several of the texts that have surfaced and I will be very vigilant with future texts and compositions. I take full responsibility for my lack of oversight and do not place the blame on anyone else but myself."

In 2020, Rosica's plagiarism was found to extend to text that he ghostwrote for Cardinal Marc Ouellet.

In 2022, new plagiarism accusations were brought against two new articles published in Il Sismografo, a Vatican-based news aggregator.

Literature 

 M.V. Dougherty and Joshua Hochschild: "Magisterial  Authority and Theological Authorship: The Harm of Plagiarism in the Practice of Theology." Horizons 48 (2022), pp. 405-55. doi:10.1017/hor.2021.60.

References

External links 
 Official Salt and Light Catholic Media Foundation Website
 

1959 births
Living people
21st-century Canadian Roman Catholic priests
Canadian television personalities
Canadian university and college chief executives
Congregation of St. Basil
Leaders of Christian parachurch organizations
Roman Catholic activists
People involved in scientific misconduct incidents
University of Toronto alumni
20th-century Canadian Roman Catholic priests